Virus is the sixth studio album by Montenegrin dance-pop recording artist Dado Polumenta. It was released 25 December 2011 through the record label Grand Production.

Background
Virus is Polumenta's third album under the label Grand Production. The song "Ženim se" is a duet with his uncle Šako Polumenta.

Release
Some of the people present at the Virus listening party in February 2012 were Dara Bubamara, Goga Sekulić, Mile Kitić, Šako Polumenta, Dejan Matić, Jovan Perišić, and rappers Cvija, MC Stojan, MC Janko and Juice, among others.

Track listing
Virus
Esma
Hipnotisan
Večeras
Ti nisi prava žena
Balkan
Ženim se
Parti manijak
Ko zna gdje si (Pos Na To Exigiso)

References

External links
Virus at Discogs

2011 albums
Dado Polumenta albums
Grand Production albums